According to Hindu traditions, Shraddhadeva Manu (Sanskrit manuśraddhādeva) is the current Manu and the progenitor of the current manvantara. He is considered as the seventh of the fourteen Manus of the current kalpa (aeon).

Shraddhadeva was the king of the Dravida Kingdom before Pralaya, the great flood. Forewarned about the flood by the Matsya Avatar of Lord Vishnu, he saved humanity by building a boat that carried his family and the saptarishi to safety. He is the son of Vivasvana and is therefore also known as Vaivasvata Manu, and his dynasty as the Suryavaṃśa. He is also called Satyavrata (always truthful).
Ikshvaku (Sanskrit; ikṣvāku, from Sanskrit ikṣu; Pali: Okkāka), is one of the ten sons of Shraddhadeva Manu, and is credited to be the founder of the Ikshvaku Dynasty.

Suryavamsha kings

The genealogy of the Ikshvaku dynasty to Rama is mentioned in the Ramayana in two lists. The only difference between the two lists is that, Kukshi is mentioned only in the second list. In the first list, Vikukshi is mentioned as the son of Ikshavaku. The descendants of Vikukshi are known as Vikauwa.

 Vaivasvata Manu or Satyavarta (Known as Nabhi in the Bhagavata Purana).
 Ikshvaku (Known as Okkāka in Buddhist literature, as Rishabhanatha in Jain texts, and thus possibly an Avatar of Vishnu)
 Kukshi or Vikukshi or Śaśāda
  Bān,Bana or Shakuni (Son of Kukshi)
 Kakutstha or Puranjaya(Purañjaya) or Anaranya I
 Anena(Anenā)
 Prithu(Pṛthu)
 Vishtarashva(Viṣṭarāśva),Visvarandhi, or Viśvagandhi
 Chandra(Cāndra-yuvanāśva)(According to Bhāgavata Purāṇa)
 Yuvanashva I(Yuvanāśva)
 Shravasta(Śrāvasta)(According to Bhāgavata Purāṇa)
 Brihadashva(Bṛhadaśva)(According to Bhāgavata Purāṇa)
 Dhundumār(Dhundhumāra) or Kuvalayashva(Kuvalayāśva)
 Dhreedhashva(Dṛḍhāśva) or Kapilashva(Kapilāśva) or Bhadrashva(Bhadrāśva)
 Pramoda,son of Dṛḍhāśva
 Haryashva I(Haryaśva)(Married Mādhavī, daughter of Chakravarti Yayati) or Pramodak 
 Nikumbha,son ofHaryaśva
 Baharnashva(Barhaṇāśva) father of Senajit
 Giritashva
 Amitashva(Amitāśva), son of Nikumbha and father of Kṛśāśva.*
 Krishashva(Kṛśāśva) or Akrutashva(According to Agni Puran, Matsya Puran)
 Pra Senajit I 
 Yuvanashva II 
 Mandhata (Chakravarti-Samrat)
 Purukutsa I (or Vasud) and Muchukunda
 Ambarisha (Chakravarti-Samrat, and younger brother of Purukutsa I)
 Trasadasyu (Son of Purukutsa)
 Sambhruta
 Anaranya  II
 Preeshadashva
 Haryashva II 
 Hastya
 Sumana
 Tridhanva
 Trayyaruni
 Trishanku or Satyavrata II 
 Harishchandra
 Rohitashva
 Harita
 Chanchu (Contemporary of Chandravanshi King Dushyanta)
 Chakshu or Sudeva (Contemporary of Chandravanshi Emperor Bharata)
 Vijaya
 Ruruka or Brahuka
 Pratapendra
 Bruk
 Sushandhi
 Bahuk
 Vrika or  Bharata II
 Bahu or Asit
 Sagara (Chakravarti-Samrat)
 Anshuman (The son of Sagara's exiled son, Asamanja)
 Dileepa I 
 Bhagiratha (Chakravarti-Samrat)
 Suhotra
 Shruti
 Kukutsa II
 Raghu I
 Nabhaga
 Ambarisha II 
 Shindhudhwip
 Ayutayu
 Pratayu
 Rituparna
 Sarvakama I
 Sudaas
 Kalmashapada
 Asmaka(Aśmaka)
 Mulaka or Sarvakama/ II
 Dasharatha I
 Ilibil or Ananaranya III
 Vishvamashaha or Nighna (Contemporary to Kuru King Hasthi, who founded Hastinapur)
 Nidhna
 Animitra(Anamitra) 
 Duliduh or Mūlaka
 Dileepa II or Deerghabhahu or Khaṭvāṅga
 Raghu II
 Aja
 Dasaratha II (Born as Nemi)
  Bharata III (Younger brother of Rama, and ruler of Kosala on his behalf)
 Ramachandra (Avatar of Vishnu and Chakravarti-Samrat)

The other sons of Dasharatha; Lakshmana and Shatrughna were said to be the kings of Karupada and Madhupuri (as well as Vidisha) respectively.

Suryavamsha kings after Rama

After the Samadhi of Lord Ramachandra and his brothers; their sons had inherited their lands. From Rama, his sons; Kusha had inherited South Kosala and Lava had inherited North Kosala, while Bharata's children, Taksha and Pushkara had inherited Takshashila and Pushkalavati respectively. Lakshmana's children, Angada and Chandraketu had inherited Karupada and Malla respectively, and Shatrughna's children, Subahu and Shatrughati had inherited Madhupuri and Vidisha respectively.

The Puranas provide a genealogical list from Kusha to Brihadbala, who was killed by Abhimanyu in the Mahabharata war. This list is corroborated by the Raghuvamsha till Agnivarna. 

 Kusha (contemporary of Chandravanshi King Kunti) and Lava
 Atithi (contemporary of Chandravanshi King Turvasu II, and son of Kusha)
 Nishadha (founded Nishadha Kingdom)
 Nala II
 Nabhas
 Paundrika
 Ksemadhanva
 Devanika
 Ahinagu
 Ruru
 Pariyatra
 Sala
 Dala
 Bala
 Uktha
 Sahasrasva
 Para II
 Chandravaloka
 Rudraksh
 Chandragiri
 Banuchandra
 Srutayu
 Uluka
 Unnabha
 Vajranabha
 Sankhana
 Vyusitasva
 Visvasaha
 Hiranyanabha Kausalya
 Para III (Atnara)
 Brahmistha
  Putra
 Pusya
 Arthasidhi
 Dhruvasandhi
 Sudarsana
 Agnivarna
 Sighraga
 Maru
 Parsusruta
 Susandhi
 Amarsana
 Mahasvana
 Sahasvana
 Visrutvana
 Visvabhava
 Visvasahva
 Nagnajit (Father of Satya, the wife of Shri Krishna)
 Takshaka
 Brihadbala

Suryavamsha kings after Mahabharata

The Puranas also provide the list of the kings from Brihadbala to the last ruler Sumitra. But these lists mention Shakya as an individual, and incorporate the names of Shakya, Shuddodhana, Siddhartha (Gautama Buddha) and Rahula between Sanjaya and Prasenajit. The names of the kings are:

Successors of Brihadbala
Brihatkshaya (or Bruhadrunam)
Urukriya (or Gurukshep)
Vatsavyuha
Prativyoma
Bhaanu
Divakara (or Divak)
Veer Sahadeva
Brihadashva-2
Bhanuratha (or Bhanumaan)
Pratitashva
Supratika
Marudeva
Sunakshatra
Pushkara (or Kinnara)
Antariksha
Suvarna (or Sutapaa)
Sumitra (or Amitrajit)
Bruhadaraaj (Okkaka)
Rudraksh

Descendants through the Shakya Lineage
Kritanjaya (Sivisamjaya)
Ranajjaya (Sihassara)
Jayasena (Mahakoshala or Sanjaya)
Sihahanu (Shakya)
Śuddhodana (ruler of Shakya Republic of Kapilavastu)
Siddhartha Shakya (or Gautama Buddha, son of Śuddhodana)
Rāhula (only son of Gautam Buddha)

Later Ikshvakus, of the Original line and Rulers of Kosala
Sanjaya Mahākosala
Prasenajit (born when Siddhartha age 27)
Viḍūḍabha
Kshudraka (or Kuntala)
Ranaka (or Kulaka)
Suratha
Sumitra

King Sumitra was Last ruler of the Suryavamsha Dynasty of Kosala, as he was defeated by the powerful Mahapadma Nanda of Magadha in 362 BCE. However, he wasn't killed, and fled to Rohtas, located in present-day Bihar, where his son Kurma had established his reign.

See also
 Solar dynasty
 Lunar dynasty
 Vedic science
 History of India
 Puranic chronology
 History of Hinduism
 Puru and Yadu Dynasties
 List of Hindu Empires and Dynasties

Notes

References

 Sources
 

Hinduism-related lists
Solar dynasty